The NSU Delphin III streamliner motorcycle set the motorcycle land speed record in 1956. Its fairing, designed in a wind tunnel at University of Stuttgart (then Stuttgart Technical College), gave it a drag coefficient of 0.19. The same engine powered Herz to a 1951 world speed record, with a less efficient frame/fairing, the Delphin I. The engine used an unusual rotary supercharger related to NSU's eventual development of the Wankel engine. In the supercharger, both a trochoidal inner rotor and epitrochoidal outer rotor spun around a stationary shaft.

References

External links

 from Technikmuseum Speyer 

Delphin III
Land speed record motorcycles
Streamliner motorcycles